Kayoko Sugiyama (born October 31, 1961) is a Japanese former volleyball player who competed in the 1984 Summer Olympics and in the 1988 Summer Olympics.

In 1984, she was a member of the Japanese team which won the bronze medal in the Olympic tournament.

Four years later, she finished fourth with the Japanese team in the 1988 Olympic tournament.

References 
 

1961 births
Living people
Japanese women's volleyball players
Olympic volleyball players of Japan
Volleyball players at the 1984 Summer Olympics
Volleyball players at the 1988 Summer Olympics
Olympic bronze medalists for Japan
Olympic medalists in volleyball
Asian Games medalists in volleyball
Volleyball players at the 1982 Asian Games
Medalists at the 1984 Summer Olympics
Medalists at the 1982 Asian Games
Asian Games silver medalists for Japan